Eupolybothrus is a genus of centipedes in the family Lithobiidae.

The genus includes the following species:

Eupolybothrus andreevi
Eupolybothrus caesar
Eupolybothrus cavernicolus  
Eupolybothrus dolops 
Eupolybothrus excellens 
Eupolybothrus fasciatus 
Eupolybothrus gloriastygis 
Eupolybothrus grossipes 
Eupolybothrus kahfi  
Eupolybothrus herzegowinensis  
Eupolybothrus imperialis 
Eupolybothrus leostygis 
Eupolybothrus litoralis 
Eupolybothrus longicornis 
Eupolybothrus nudicornis 
Eupolybothrus obrovensis 
Eupolybothrus transsylvanicus 
Eupolybothrus tabularum 
Eupolybothrus tridentinus 
Eupolybothrus werneri 
Eupolybothrus zeus

References

Centipede genera
Lithobiomorpha